Mario Dino Patrick Melchiot (born 4 November 1976) is a Dutch former professional footballer who played as a defender. He played both as a right-back and as a centre-back, and also occasionally played in midfield.

Early life
Melchiot was born and raised in Amsterdam, living with his two brothers and two sisters. He enjoyed a close relationship with his eldest brother, Winston, who acted as Mario's mentor after their parents split up. When Winston died of a heart attack at the age of 25, Melchiot considered giving up football.

Club career

Ajax
Melchiot started his career in the youth system at Ajax, and made his debut in the 1996–97 season. He scored his first goal for the club in the semi-final of the Champions League in a 4–1 defeat against Juventus. Melchiot spent three seasons at the club, winning the Eredivisie in 1998 and the KNVB Cup in 1998 and 1999. In the summer of 1999, he signed a three-year contract with Chelsea under the Bosman ruling.

Chelsea
For most of his first season at the club, Melchiot did not feature in the first team due to injuries. However, on 22 April 2000, following an injury to Albert Ferrer, he finally made his debut in a 1–1 draw against Middlesbrough. A month later he played in the 2000 FA Cup Final against Aston Villa where he played a major role in helping Chelsea win the match.

At the start of the 2000–01 season, Melchiot scored his first goal for Chelsea in a 2–0 win against Manchester United in the 2000 FA Charity Shield. His second goal was also against Manchester United, as he helped his team to a memorable 3–0 win at Old Trafford in the 2001–02 season. Under the management of Claudio Ranieri, He quickly established himself as the club's first-choice right-back, and was soon rewarded with a contract extension, keeping him at the club until 2004.

Birmingham City
Melchiot signed for Birmingham City on a three-year contract in July 2004, and made his debut in a 1–1 draw against Portsmouth. In his second season, Birmingham found themselves in a relegation battle. He soon became a scapegoat for the club's poor performances, and was booed by his own supporters in a match against Tottenham Hotspur. Birmingham were finally relegated in April 2006 after a 0–0 draw with Newcastle United. He played his last game for Birmingham in their 1–0 defeat to Bolton Wanderers on 7 May 2006. He scored two league goals during his spell at Birmingham, against Charlton Athletic and Wigan Athletic.

Rennes
In August 2006, Melchiot joined French outfit Rennes on a one-year contract. He scored his first goal for the club in a Coupe de la Ligue Round of 16 tie against Ligue 2 club Libourne-Saint-Seurin. He endeared himself to the Rennes faithful when he scored his first league goal for the club in a 2–0 win over fierce rivals Nantes. Melchiot's contract with Rennes lasted until the summer of 2007.

Wigan Athletic
Melchiot joined Wigan Athletic on a free transfer on 15 June 2007. On 24 July 2007, he was given the Wigan captaincy, following the departure of his compatriot Arjan de Zeeuw. He became a fan-favourite at the JJB Stadium, and made Latics history when he became the first Wigan player to play in a major international tournament by coming on for the Netherlands against Romania at the UEFA Euro 2008 tournament. He made over 100 appearances for Wigan during his three years at the club.

Umm Salal
In June 2010, Melchiot turned down a new contract from Wigan and agreed to join Umm-Salal Sports Club on a free transfer after his existing contract expired at the end of the month. He was signed by Umm Salal manager, Henk ten Cate, as he was reportedly interested in an experienced defender after signing Spanish midfielder Gabri. He made his debut in a 2–2 draw against Al-Arabi. At the end of the 2010–11 Qatar Stars League Season, he left Umm-Salal as they opted not to give him a new one-year contract.

International career
Melchiot was capped 22 times for the Netherlands since making his international debut on 11 October 2000 in a 2–0 World Cup qualifier defeat against Portugal. His last international appearance was in the final group match of UEFA Euro 2008 against Romania on 17 June 2008.

Outside football
In 1998, Melchiot and Ajax teammates Benni McCarthy and Dean Gorre, calling themselves BMD, released a rap/R & B track called "Midas Touch". He has also campaigned for the British Heart Foundation and has appeared on the quiz show A Question of Sport.

Career statistics

Honours
Ajax
Eredivisie: 1997–98
KNVB Cup: 1997–98, 1999–99
Ajax talent of the year 1997

Chelsea
FA Cup: 1999–2000; runner-up: 2001–02
FA Charity Shield: 2000

References

External links

Mario Melchiot's profile, stats & pics

Wereld van oranje.nl Profile 
Netherlands youth at OnsOranje

1976 births
Living people
Footballers from Amsterdam
Dutch footballers
Netherlands youth international footballers
Netherlands under-21 international footballers
Netherlands international footballers
Association football defenders
AFC Ajax players
Chelsea F.C. players
Birmingham City F.C. players
Stade Rennais F.C. players
Wigan Athletic F.C. players
Umm Salal SC players
Eredivisie players
Premier League players
Ligue 1 players
Qatar Stars League players
UEFA Euro 2008 players
Dutch expatriate footballers
Expatriate footballers in England
Expatriate footballers in France
Expatriate footballers in Qatar
Dutch expatriate sportspeople in England
Dutch expatriate sportspeople in France
Dutch expatriate sportspeople in Qatar
Dutch sportspeople of Surinamese descent
FA Cup Final players